Veerabhadra Temple may refer to:

Veerabhadra Temple, Lepakshi, a temple in Lepakshi, Anantapur district, Andhra Pradesh, India
Veerabhadra Temple, Yadur, a temple in Belgaum district, Karnataka, India